Beta-galactoside alpha-2,6-sialyltransferase 1 is an enzyme that in humans is encoded by the ST6GAL1 gene.

The protein encoded by this gene is a type II membrane protein that catalyzes the transfer of sialic acid from CMP-sialic acid to galactose-containing substrates. The encoded protein, which is normally found in the Golgi but which can be proteolytically processed to a soluble form, is involved in the generation of the cell-surface carbohydrate determinants and differentiation antigens HB-6, CDw75, and CD76. This protein is a member of glycosyltransferase family 29. Three transcript variants encoding two different isoforms have been found for this gene.

Transcripts of ST6GAL1 are found in mouse high endothelial cells of mesenteric lymph node and Peyer's patches, and it could be involved in the B cell homing to Peyer's patches.

References

Further reading